Lex Aebutia de magistratibus extraordinariis  (The Aebutian Law Concerning Extraordinary Magistracies) was a law established in ancient Rome during the early 2nd century BC, though the date remains uncertain. It is likewise uncertain whether this Lex Aebutia was part of the Lex Aebutia de formulis. 

Presumably introduced by the magistrate Sextus Aelius, this law prohibited the sponsor of legislation creating a public office (curatio ac potestas, lit. office of trust or power) from holding that office. The colleagues of the sponsor in his magistracy and his near relatives by blood and marriage likewise were forbidden from the new office.

See also 
Roman Law
List of Roman laws

External links
The Roman Law Library, incl. Leges
Entry from Harry Thurston Peck, "Harpers Dictionary of Classical Antiquities" (from the Perseus Project)

2nd century BC in law
Roman law